Adel Khalil is a former Commander of the Egyptian Air Defense Forces.

He graduated from the Military College on July 1951, and was commissioned in a Signals unit. Khalil commanded a Signals Company in the Suez War. He was inducted into the Air Defence Forces in 1968 as a colonel, and was commander of the Air Defence Forces from January 1986 to December 1987.

Major activities 
Second in command of a Brigade of Air Defence units during 6 October war. Continuing the studies of applying the automation system to Air Defence forces.

He participated in the following wars:

 Tripartite Aggression
 The Six-Day War
 The Yom Kippur War

References

Egyptian generals
Year of birth missing (living people)
Living people